Bar Aftab-e Sofla or Bar Aftab-e Pain, both meaning "Lower Bar Aftab", may refer to:
 Bar Aftab-e Sofla, Khuzestan
 Bar Aftab-e Sofla, Kohgiluyeh and Boyer-Ahmad
 Bar Aftab-e Sofla, Charusa, Kohgiluyeh and Boyer-Ahmad Province